Selwyn Jepson (25 November 1899 – 10 March 1989) was an English mystery and detective author and screenwriter. He was the son of the fiction writer Edgar Jepson (1863–1938) and Frieda Holmes, daughter of the musician Henry Holmes. His sister Margaret (1907–2003) was also a novelist and the mother of the author Fay Weldon.<ref>"Margaret Birkinshaw" (obituary), The Times, 24 January 2003.</ref>

Youth and SOE Service
Jepson was born in Bloomsbury and educated at St Paul's School, London and the Sorbonne. He served in the Tank Corps during World War I and in the Special Operations Executive (SOE) in World War II. In the latter role he recruited for the independent French F section, as one of the SOE's "most skilled craftsmen" and its senior recruiting officer. When interviewed by the Imperial War Museum he stated:
<blockquote>I was responsible for recruiting women for the work, in the face of a good deal of opposition, I may say, from the powers that be. In my view, women were very much better than men for the work. Women, as you must know, have a far greater capacity for cool and lonely courage than men. Men usually want a mate with them. Men don't work alone, their lives tend to be always in company with other men. There was opposition from most quarters until it went up to Churchill, whom I had met before the war. He growled at me, "What are you doing?" I told him and he said, "I see you are using women to do this," and I said, "Yes, don't you think it is a very sensible thing to do?" and he said, "Yes, good luck to you." That was my authority!"

M. R. D. Foot's SOE contains an illuminating account of Jepson's interview style with potential recruits; "I have to decide whether I can risk your life and you have to decide whether you're willing to risk it" (p. 73). According to Foot, of F section's 470 agents sent into the field, 117 were killed; 39 of the 470 were women, of whom 13 failed to return.

As an aside Foot comments that Captain (Royal Navy) was a rank Jepson sometimes affected but to which he was not entitled ("...but the Admiralty never knew"), rather he was "a major in the Buffs".

Author
Jepson became a well-known mystery/detective author and screenwriter, best known for Keep Murder Quiet (1940), the "Eve Gill" ingénue sleuth novel series, and other non-series novels:The Qualified Adventurer (1922)Puppets of Fate (1922)Golden-Eyes (1922), US title The Sutton PapersThat Fellow MacArthur (1923)The King's Red-Haired Girl (1923)Rogues and Diamonds (1925)Snaggletooth (1926)The Death Gong (1927)Love and Helen (1928)Tiger Dawn (1929)I Met Murder (1930)Rabbit's Paw (1932) US title The Mystery of the Rabbit's PawHeads and Tails (1933) short story collectionLove in Peril (1934)The Wise Fool (1934)Riviera Love Story (1948)Man Running (1948), as Outrun the Constable in the US. In 1950, it was published in paperback as Killer by ProxyTempering Steel (1949)Man Dead (1951)The Assassin (1956)A Noise in the Night (1957)The Third Possibility (1965)The Angry Millionaire (1968)Letter to a Dead Girl (1971)

Screenwriter and directorFor Love of You (1933) screenwriterMoney Mad (1934) screenwriterKiss Me Goodbye (1935) screenwriterHyde Park Corner (1935) screenwriterThe Love Test (1935) screenwriterThe Riverside Murder (1935) screenwriterToilers of the Sea (1936) director, screenwriterWell Done, Henry (1936) screenwriterWedding Group (1936) screenwriterThe Scarab Murder Case (1936) screenwriterSailing Along (1938) screenwriterThe Red Dress (1954) screenwriterThe Last Moment (1954) screenwriterForever My Heart (1954) screenwriter

Film adaptation
The Alfred Hitchcock film Stage Fright (1950) was based on Selwyn Jepson's 1948 novel Man Running (also published as Outrun the Constable and Killer by Proxy). It was adapted for the screen by Whitfield Cook and Hitchcock's wife and frequent collaborator Alma Reville, with additional dialogue by James Bridie and Ranald MacDougall.

Television
Selwyn Jepson had many pieces converted for broadcast by the BBC. BBC archival material exists for their productions of The Golden Dart and The Hungry Spider'' is held by the Mausoleum Club.

Private life
For his private use, Selwyn Jepson built the Far House, Farther Common, Liss, Hampshire.

References

External links

1899 births
1989 deaths
People from Liss
People educated at St Paul's School, London
University of Paris alumni
British Army personnel of World War I
British Army personnel of World War II
British male screenwriters
British Special Operations Executive personnel
20th-century British screenwriters